Régis Racine (born 13 October 1970 in Paris, France) is a French basketball player who played 3 games for the men's French national team in 1994 .

References

French men's basketball players
1970 births
Living people
Basketball players from Paris
Basket CRO Lyon players
Montpellier Paillade Basket players